Qarah Qayah (also Romanized as Qareh Qayeh) is a village in Razliq Rural District, in the Central District of Sarab County, East Azerbaijan Province, Iran. At the 2006 census, its population was 291, in 66 families.

References 

Populated places in Sarab County